Federica Salva (born 7 October 1971) is an Italian yacht racer who competed in the 1996 Summer Olympics and in the 2000 Summer Olympics.

References

External links
 
 
 

1971 births
Living people
Italian female sailors (sport)
Olympic sailors of Italy
Sailors at the 1996 Summer Olympics – 470
Sailors at the 2000 Summer Olympics – 470